"Country Song" is a song by British singer songwriter Jake Bugg. It was released as the second single from his debut album studio album Jake Bugg (2012). It was released as a digital download in the United Kingdom on 30 June 2012.

Music video
A music video to accompany the release of "Country Song" was first released onto YouTube on 13 April 2012 at a total length of two minutes and eight seconds. This was done to coincide with the track being used on the million pound advertising campaign from Greene King IPA which propelled Jake's career forwards

Live performances
Bugg performed the song on the BBC Introducing Stage at Glastonbury 2011. On 25 May 2012, he performed the song on Later... with Jools Holland.

Track listings

Chart performance

Release history

References

2012 singles
2012 songs
Jake Bugg songs
Songs written by Jake Bugg
Mercury Records singles
Country ballads